Reginald C. Hayes (born July 15, 1969) is an American actor, screenwriter, and director. He is best known for his role as William Dent on the UPN/CW show Girlfriends.

Early life
Hayes was born on July 15, 1969 in Chicago, Illinoisyoungest of four children. He attended St. John's Northwestern Military Academy, who recognized him as one of three "Notable Men of the Academy". After the Academy, he attended Illinois State University, where he obtained a bachelor's degree in Theater. In 2004, he won the "Outstanding Young Alumni Award" and was a member of the Illinois Shakespeare Festival.

Career
Hayes is an avid supporter of his community and worked alongside his sister at various events for a charity titled the "Reginald and Frances Hayes H.O.P.E. Scholarship Award".

Hayes is best known for his role as William Dent on UPN/CW's hit TV show Girlfriends that aired for eight years, ending in 2008. It earned him the "Best Supporting Actor in a Comedy Series" for three NAACP Image Awards. He went on to appear in several other movies and TV shows, including Criminal Minds, Will & Grace, NCIS, Femme Fatales and Abbott Elementary.

After a short career break, Hayes teamed up with Lock & Key Entertainment.

Hayes has spoken about the resurgence of interest in Girlfriends'' after its addition to Netflix.

Awards

Actor Reginald C. Hayes was among the first to be recognized as one of three "Notable Men of the Academy" from St. John's Northwestern Military Academy on May 28, 2011.

Filmography

Stage
 Chicago productions of "Chicago Conspiracy Trial"
 "A Raisin in the Sun" The John F. Kennedy Center for the Performing Arts
 "Hellcab Does Christmas"
 "Bang the Drum Slowly"
 "Othello"
 "Five Times Noh"
 "Any Place but Here"
 "Less Than Equal"
 "Native Speech"
 "No One Goes Mad"
 "Inspecting Carol"
 "Richard II"
 Numerous other Shakespeare productions.

References

External links
 
 Reggie Hayes's biography on filmbug
 Reggie Hayes interview
 Instagram @reggieh69

1969 births
African-American male actors
American male film actors
American male television actors
American male screenwriters
American directors
Living people
Male actors from Chicago
American male stage actors
Screenwriters from Illinois
21st-century African-American people
20th-century African-American people